In 2022 Chile produced about 18% of its electricity from solar power, up from 7% in 2018. As of 2022, Chile produces the highest percentage of its electricity from solar in the world. At the end of 2021 Chile was ranked 22nd in the world in terms of installed solar energy (4.4 GW).

In October 2015 Chile's Ministry of Energy announced its "Roadmap to 2050: A Sustainable and Inclusive Strategy", which planned for 19% of the country's electricity to be from solar energy, 23% wind power, and 29% hydroelectric power.

Solar resource
Northern Chile has the highest solar incidence in the world.

Photovoltaics

Solar thermal power 

In 2013 the Atacama 1 solar complex was proposed as a 110 MW solar thermal electric plant (the first in Latin America) and a 100 MW photovoltaic plant. The solar thermal plant will include 17.5 hours of thermal storage. These technologies complement each other to supply clean and stable energy 24 hours a day. The complex is located in the commune of María Elena, Segunda Región. Construction of the solar thermal electric plant commenced in 2014 and the plant was scheduled to begin operating in the second quarter of 2017, but got delayed significantly.  Construction of the photovoltaic plant commenced in January 2015 and the plant began operating in June 2016 with 160 MW of panels, the largest solar plant in Chile at the time. By the end of 2020 the project was fully erected under the name Cerro Dominador Solar Thermal Plant and is expected to fully operate in 2021.

Because of its good solar resource several international companies have bid record low prices for solar thermal power plants in Chile, including the Copiapó Solar Project bid at $63/MWh  by SolarReserve in 2017. If realized this would have been the lowest ever price for a CSP project in the world. Several CSP projects are under development in Chile, but in the absence of technology specific support policies Cerro Dominador is the only one under construction, yet.

Significant photovoltaics projects 

In June 2014, the 100-megawatt (MW) Amanecer Solar CAP, a photovoltaic power plant located near Copiapó in the Atacama Desert was inaugurated. It was developed by the company with the same name, Amanecer Solar CAP, and was the largest in Latin America at the time. It is capable of generating 270 gigawatt-hours (GWh) of electricity per year.

The 70 MW photovoltaic Salvador Solar Park went online in November 2014, followed by an official inauguration ceremony on 23 January 2015. It was expected to produce 200 GWh of electricity per year. The plant is located approximately 5 kilometres south of El Salvador, in the Atacama region. It is one of the first in the world to supply competitively priced solar energy to the open market without government subsidy.

The 60 MW photovoltaic Lalackama I plant went online in 2014 and is expected to produce 160 GWh of electricity per year. The nearby 18 MW Lalackama II plant went online in May 2015 and is capable of generating approximately 50 GWh per year. Both plants feature photovoltaic inverters designed and manufactured by Elettronica Santerno, an Italian company.

The 141 MW photovoltaic Luz Del Norte (Light of the North) plant, located 58 kilometres northeast of the city of Copiapó in the Atacama region, began construction in October 2014 and is scheduled for completion in December 2015.  It uses more than 1.7 million cadmium telluride modules.  The first two blocks of this project (approximately half of the project's total capacity) was connected to Chile's central power grid in October 2015. The plant supplies ancillary grid services.

The 79 MW Pampa Norte PV solar plant began operating in April 2016 at a site 32 kilometres southwest of Taltal in Chile's Antofagasta Region.  It uses approximately 258,000 polycrystalline silicon photovoltaic modules and is capable of generating more than 200 GWh per year. The plant was developed by Enel Green Power and features photovoltaic inverters designed and manufactured by Elettronica Santerno.

The 97 MW Carrera Pinto photovoltaic plant is located 60 kilometres from the city of Copiapó in the Atacama Region.  The first 20 MW of the plant was connected to the grid in early January 2016, with the remaining 77 MW connected in August 2016.  The plant is capable of generating over 260 GWh per year.

The 246 MW El Romero single-axis tracking solar photovoltaic plant began operating in November 2016 at Vallenar in the Atacama region, with a 493 GWh annual average output. It was the largest solar farm in Latin America when it opened. It uses 776,000 polycrystalline silicon photovoltaic modules. The solar irradiance has been measured at 853 W/m2.

In 2016, SolarPack won an electricity auction by bidding $29.1/MWh; a record low price.  In March 2020 PV Magazine reported that Solarpack had begun providing power on 2 March 2020, to the Chilean grid from its 123 MW Granja project, 10 months ahead of the contracted date of 1 January 2021.  With that, Solarpack raised its total operating capacity in Chile at the time to 181 MW.

See also

 Renewable energy in Chile
 List of photovoltaic power stations
 Solar power by country
 Growth of photovoltaics

References